Parliamentary elections were held in Portugal on 1 November 1942. The country was a one-party state at the time and the National Union was the only party to contest the elections, with no opposition candidates allowed to run.

Electoral system
For the elections the country formed a single 100-member constituency. All men aged 21 or over were eligible to vote as long as they were literate or paid over 100 escudos in taxation, whilst women aged over 21 had to have completed secondary education to do so. However, only 11% of the population were registered to vote.

Results

References

See also
Politics of Portugal
List of political parties in Portugal
Elections in Portugal

Legislative elections in Portugal
Portugal
Legislative
One-party elections
Single-candidate elections
Portugal